Həmzəli or Gamzali or Gamzaly may refer to:
Həmzəli, Kurdamir, Azerbaijan
Həmzəli, Nakhchivan, Azerbaijan
Həmzəli, Qabala, Azerbaijan
Həmzəli, Qubadli, Azerbaijan